Durley Halt railway station was the only intermediate stop on the  mile Bishops Waltham branch line that  connected Bishops Waltham to Botley. Opened in 1909 it was only ever lightly used but remained open to passengers until the last train called on 31 December 1932; Freight trains continued along the line past the station until 1962.

See also 
List of closed railway stations in Britain

References

External links
 Geograph
 Durley Halt at Disused Stations

Route

Disused railway stations in Hampshire
Former London and South Western Railway stations
Railway stations in Great Britain opened in 1909
Railway stations in Great Britain closed in 1933